Saeki-kuyakusyo-mae (Saeki Ward Office) is a Hiroden station on Hiroden Miyajima Line, located in front of Saeki Ward Office, in Kairoen, Saeki-ku, Hiroshima.

Routes
From Saeki-kuyakusyo-mae (Saeki Ward Office) Station, there is one of Hiroden Streetcar routes.
 Hiroshima Station - Hiroden-miyajima-guchi Route

Connections
█ Miyajima Line

Hiroden-itsukaichi — Saeki-kuyakusyo-mae (Saeki Ward Office) — Rakurakuen

Around station
Hiroshima Saeki Ward Office

History
Opened on March 27, 1987.

See also
Hiroden Streetcar Lines and Routes

References

Saeki-kuyakusyo-mae Station
Railway stations in Japan opened in 1987